Savana is a leading independent weekly newspaper in Mozambique.  It is based in Maputo, written in the Portuguese language, and published by Mediacoop.  

Mediacoop also publishes mediaFAX.

External links
Savana page at afrol

Mass media in Mozambique